Monster Movie is a 2008 horror comedy film by the Polonia brothers. It marks the last film created by the filmmaking duo before John Polonia's death at age 39.

Plot
Four friends find more than they bargained for on a trip to the country.

References

External links
 

2008 comedy horror films
2008 horror films
2008 films
American comedy horror films
2008 comedy films
Films directed by Mark Polonia
2000s English-language films
2000s American films